Lock 'n Load is Denis Leary's second album, co-written with Chris Philips and released in 1997. It features material by Adam Roth, Janeane Garofalo and Jeff Garlin, and music by Greg Dulli. It was also an HBO television special directed by Ted Demme. The album features clips of Leary's onstage stand-up monologues mixed with various skits and songs. It is designed to sound as though the listener is listening to the radio, with frequent cuts as though the station is being changed.

Track listing
Fuck This – 0:25
Asshole of the Dance – 4:37
Marv Marv Marv – 2:12
Save This – 3:26
Deaf Mute Cocktail Party – 2:22
Coffee – 7:56
Beer – 4:19
Fuck Santa – 1:22
Elvis and I – 4:23
I'm Happy – 0:11
Fuck the Kennedys – 1:06
President Leary – 4:47
A Reading from the Book of Apple – 1:32
Love Barge – 6:19
Fat Fucks – 5:50
Insane Cowboy (In Africa) – 1:12
My Kids – 16:04
Life's Gonna Suck – 1:43
Fuck the Pope – 3:22
Lock 'n Load – 4:39

Personnel
Denis Leary – vocals, spoken vocals
Chris Phillips – vocals, guitar, bass, harmonica
Greg Dulli – guitar, keyboards, piano, sampler
Dave Hillis – guitar, programming, drum loops, sampler
Adam Roth – guitars, vocals
C.P. Roth – bass, keyboards
Mike Horrigan – drums, bass
Pete Mark – drums, percussion
Don Castagno – drums
Janeane Garofalo - herself
Donal Logue - himself
Joe Blaney - recording engineer, producer
John Seymour - studio engineer
Dave Hills - engineer
Jay Vacari - remix engineer
Steve Remote - chief engineer

References

Denis Leary albums
HBO network specials
1997 albums
Stand-up comedy concert films
1997 television specials
1990s comedy albums
A&M Records albums